San Patricio - Melaque in the Mexican state of Jalisco is a busy community located 4+ kilometers northwest of Barra de Navidad on Bahia de Navidad. The area comprises two beachfront villages: San Patricio - Melaque and Villa Obregon all generally referred to as "Melaque." The small village of Melaque has been a vacation retreat for Mexicans for generations. San Patricio - Melaque, a kilometer long strip on the west end of the bay, is named after the Ejido San Patricio and before that a small Rancho named San Patricio. Downtown Melaque contains a colorful town square, many retail shops, two banks, many restaurants and a few hardware stores. Villa Obregon, to the east, is much more residential. The two areas of San Patricio - Melaque and Villa Obregon form the largest community along the coast between Puerto Vallarta and Cihuatlan. Playa Melaque is the main beach in the area and good for swimming, bodyboarding, and skimboarding.  The west end of Melaque beach is protected from the large swells found elsewhere on the beach, allowing for swimming for children and the less adventurous.

The sewer treatment plant out near the highway has not operated in some years. The sewage goes into Playa Melaque untreated.

External links 

San Patrico - Melaque, Jalisco

Populated places in Jalisco